Ano Jawhar Abdulmaseeh Abdoka (born in 1984 in Ankawa) is  Chaldean politician who serves as the Minister of Transportations and Communications of Kurdistan Region of Iraq since July 2019. Before serving as a minister, Abdoka led and still leading Shlama Trend for Christian Affairs in Kurdistan and Iraq, and also leading the biggest Christian Chaldean Assyrian Syriac Alliance and block in Kurdistan Parliament, previously he led  the local committee of the Kurdistan Democratic Party in Ankawa Erbil. Abdoka is a Chaldean Catholic and is fluent in Syriac, English, Kurdish and Arabic.

In February 2020, Abdoka took part in an official Kurdish delegation to the Vatican City to meet Pope Francis and strengthen relations.

Tenure
Abdoka took his oath on a centuries-old manuscript damaged by ISIS as a symbolic gesture. During his tenure as Minister of Transportations and Communications, the Ministry began reforming the transportation sector by outlawing smoking in taxis and buses. Moreover, the Ministry successfully pushed internet companies to reduce the price of internet and also improve its speed.

See also
Lara Zara

References

Living people
Chaldean Catholics
Iraqi Assyrian people
People from Erbil Governorate
Kurdistan Democratic Party politicians
1984 births